is a former Japanese football player.

Playing career
Iijima was born in Machida on January 6, 1970. After graduating from Tokai University, he joined Nagoya Grampus Eight in 1992. He played often as right side back during the 1993 season. In 1995, the club won the Emperor's Cup, the first major title in club history. In 1997, the club won second place in the Asian Cup Winners' Cup. However, he did not play as much in 1998, less than Ko Ishikawa, who came to the club in 1998. In 2001, he moved to the J2 League club Kawasaki Frontale and he played in many matches. In 2002, he moved to the J2 club Avispa Fukuoka. Although he played in many matches, he left the club and he retired at the end of the 2002 season.

Club statistics

References

External links

1970 births
Living people
Tokai University alumni
Association football people from Tokyo
Japanese footballers
J1 League players
J2 League players
Nagoya Grampus players
Kawasaki Frontale players
Avispa Fukuoka players
Association football defenders